Gradishte is a village in Northern Bulgaria. It is located in the municipality of Gabrovo, Gabrovo region.

Geography

Story

Cultural and natural attractions

Regular events

Other 

Villages in Gabrovo Province